Fletcher Humphrys (born 1 April 1976) is an Australian actor.  He is best known for his roles as Brett 'Brick' Buchanon in McLeod's Daughters and as Alex Kearns in All Saints.

Career
Humphrys made his acting debut in 1993, appearing in Australian drama film The Heartbreak Kid.  His first major acting role was in the children's television series The Genie From Down Under, for which he played 'Conrad von Meister' for the shows two seasons from 1996 to 1998.  Humphrys appeared in several episodes of the short-lived series Thunderstone.  In 2001, he received the recurring role of Brett 'Brick' Buchanon on the popular drama series McLeod's Daughters; he appeared in the shows first three seasons until his character was killed off in 2003.  Following his role on McLeod's Daughters, Humphrys appeared in another recurring role in medical drama All Saints, in which he played Alex Kearns from 2003 to 2004. During October 2006 and April 2008, he guest starred as Guy Sykes, an acquaintance of Katya Kinski (Dichen Lachman) on Network Ten's Neighbours. He later returned in early 2009 for another guest appearance. In 2011, he played a leading role in drama series Small Time Gangster.  He appeared in a guest role on Australia's most popular soap opera Home and Away as gang leader Jake Pirovic.  Several of his other credits include A Country Practice, Stingers, Last Man Standing, Blue Heelers and East of Everything.  His film credits include Chopper, Guru Wayne, Razor Eaters, Crawlspace and the upcoming film John Doe.

Filmography

References

External links

Australian male soap opera actors
Male actors from Melbourne
1976 births
Living people